Jonathan Summerton (born April 21, 1988, in Kissimmee, Florida) is an American race car driver.

Early racing
He began racing karts at the age of 14 and by the end of the year had begun racing Skip Barber Series cars. In 2004 he began racing in Formula BMW USA and won the Formula BMW USA Scholarship to race in the USA where in his first year with several wins and fastest laps he came second in the championship. The following year he entered the BMW international series where he finished second at Spa-Francorchamps and finished tenth in the championship. In 2006 he competed in Formula Three Euro Series where he finished 3rd at Spa 2nd at LeMans and won the final Hockenheim race and finished ninth in the championship.

A1 Grand Prix
In 2007 he made starts in the A1 Grand Prix series for A1 Team USA and took second in the feature race at Autódromo Hermanos Rodríguez in Mexico City. For the rest of 2007 he drove a partial season in F3 EuroSeries after being the test driver in the debut of the new Volkswagen engine for RC Motorsport and tested a Champ Car Atlantic Series car for Derrick Walker. He returned to A1 Team USA for the 2007–08 A1 Grand Prix season. Summerton captured A1 Team USA's first A1GP victory in the feature race at Shanghai. The American team would eventually finish 12th in the championship, with Summerton finishing 2nd in the final sprint race of the campaign, at Brands Hatch.

Atlantics and Indy Lights
For the 2008 season, Summerton raced in the Atlantic Championship for Newman Wachs Racing winning two races and finishing 3rd in points. He was signed by the USF1 team to be its main driver but the team later folded due to lack of funding. For the 2009 season he signed with RLR/Andersen Racing to race in the Firestone Indy Lights Series in addition to competing in Atlantics races with Genoa Racing. He later switched teams and returned to Newman Wachs Racing after Genoa shut down and finished in a first-place tie to teammate John Edwards, but lost the tiebreaker. His Indy Lights season came to an end with a crash at the Milwaukee Mile and the team brought on pay drivers to complete the season in the #9 car. He finished second in his first Indy Lights start on the Streets of St. Petersburg and was in the top-five in the championship at the time of his departure, even leading the championship after the first three races of the season. He made one start in 2010 for Walker Racing before being replaced by Dan Clarke.

Sports car racing
After two years on the sidelines, Summerton was signed to Rahal Letterman Lanigan Racing for the 2012 12 Hours of Sebring along with fellow BMW drivers Joey Hand and Dirk Müller in the GTLM class. Winning his first race the coveted 12 hours of Sebring in their class and 18th overall. Summerton set fastest race laps at 2 events along with finishing at Petit LeMans 3rd place.

Racing record

Complete Formula 3 Euro Series results
(key) (Races in bold indicate pole position) (Races in italics indicate fastest lap)

† – As Summerton was a guest driver, he was ineligible for points.

Complete A1 Grand Prix results
(key) (Races in bold indicate pole position) (Races in italics indicate fastest lap)

American open-wheel racing results
(key) (Races in bold indicate pole position) (Races in italics indicate fastest lap)

Atlantic Championship

Indy Lights

References

External links

1988 births
Formula 3 Euro Series drivers
A1 Team USA drivers
Atlantic Championship drivers
Living people
Formula BMW ADAC drivers
Formula BMW USA drivers
Indy Lights drivers
People from Kissimmee, Florida
Racing drivers from Florida
Sportspeople from Greater Orlando
American Le Mans Series drivers
A1 Grand Prix drivers
BMW M drivers
Rahal Letterman Lanigan Racing drivers
Mücke Motorsport drivers
RC Motorsport drivers
Newman Wachs Racing drivers
Walker Racing drivers
Team Rosberg drivers